This article lists all the players that played for different tiers of the Italy national football teams while with A.C. Milan. Players who represented Italy before or after they played for Milan are unlisted. The players who were called up to the squad but did not play in any games are unlisted.

List of call-ups of A.C. Milan players to the Italy national teams
Updated July 2018

List of call-ups of A.C. Milan players to the Italy national football teams

 Ignazio Abate
 Christian Abbiati
 Francesco Acerbi
 Demetrio Albertini
 José Altafini
 Massimo Ambrosini
 Carlo Ancelotti
 Carlo Annovazzi
 Angelo Anquilletti
 Luca Antonelli
 Luca Antonini
 Alberto Aquilani
 Pietro Arcari
 Roberto Baggio
 Mario Balotelli
 Franco Baresi
 Sergio Battistini
 Gastone Bean
 Romeo Benetti
 Mario Bergamaschi
 Andrea Bertolacci
 Aldo Boffi
 Giacomo Bonaventura
 Daniele Bonera
 Dario Bonetti
 Andrea Bonomi
 Leonardo Bonucci
 Marco Borriello
 Cristian Brocchi
 Lorenzo Buffon
 Ruben Buriani
 Renzo Burini
 Fabio Capello
 Egidio Capra
 Riccardo Carapellese
 Gustavo Carrer
 Antonio Cassano
 Alessio Cerci
 Aldo Cevenini
 Luciano Chiarugi
 Francesco Coco
 Fulvio Collovati
 Andrea Conti
 Alessandro Costacurta
 Patrick Cutrone
 Mario David
 Mattia De Sciglio
 Renzo De Vecchi
 Roberto Donadoni
 Gianluigi Donnarumma
 Stephan El Shaarawy
 Stefano Eranio
 Alberigo Evani
 Alfio Fontana
 Amleto Frignani
 Carlo Galli
 Gennaro Gattuso
 Giorgio Ghezzi
 Alberto Gilardino
 Pietro Grosso
 Filippo Inzaghi
 Pietro Lana
 Gianluigi Lentini
 Giovanni Lodetti
 Cesare Lovati
 Mario Magnozzi
 Saul Malatrasi
 Aldo Maldera
 Cesare Maldini
 Paolo Maldini
 Daniele Massaro
 Riccardo Montolivo
 Bruno Mora
 Alessandro Nesta
 Antonio Nocerino
 Walter Novellino
 Massimo Oddo
 Giuseppe Pancaro
 Christian Panucci
 Giampaolo Pazzini
 Andrea Pirlo
 Pierino Prati
 Andrea Poli
 Luigi Radice
 Eduardo Ricagni
 Gianni Rivera
 Giuseppe Rizzi
 Alessio Romagnoli
 Roberto Rosato
 Paolo Rossi
 Sebastiano Rossi
 Giuseppe Sabadini
 Luigi Sala
 Marco Sala
 Sandro Salvadore
 Juan Alberto Schiaffino
 Abdon Sgarbi
 Arturo Silvestri
 Marco Simone
 Mauro Tassotti
 Omero Tognon
 Giovanni Trapattoni
 Mario Trebbi
 Attilio Treré
 Christian Vieri
 Gianluca Zambrotta
 Luciano Zecchini

List of call-ups of A.C. Milan players to the Italian Olympic football teams

 Ignazio Abate
 Demetrio Albertini
 Francesco Antonioli
 Franco Baresi
 Fulvio Collovati

List of call-ups of A.C. Milan players to the Italy national under-23 football teams

 Marcello Campolonghi
 Francesco Coco

List of call-ups of A.C. Milan players to the Italy national under-21 football teams

 Christian Abbiati
 Demetrio Albertini
 Massimo Ambrosini
 Francesco Antonioli
 Franco Baresi
 Sergio Battistini
 Marco Borriello
 Davide Calabria
 Francesco Coco
 Fulvio Collovati
 Gianni Comandini
 Alessandro Costacurta
 Carlo Cudicini
 Patrick Cutrone
 Daniele Daino
 Samuele Dalla Bona
 Matteo Darmian
 Davide Di Gennaro
 Roberto Donadoni
 Massimo Donati
 Gianluigi Donnarumma
 Stephan El Shaarawy
 Alberigo Evani
 Diego Fuser
 Giuseppe Galderisi
 Filippo Galli
 Gennaro Gattuso
 Andrea Icardi
 Giuseppe Incocciati
 Christian Lantignotti
 Manuel Locatelli
 Tomas Locatelli
 Roberto Lorenzini
 Guido Magherini
 Aldo Maldera
 Paolo Maldini
 Angelo Marchi
 José Mauri
 Christian Panucci
 Andrea Pirlo
 Alessandro Plizzari
 Francesco Romano
 Alessio Romagnoli
 Stefano Salvatori
 Marco Simone
 Giovanni Stroppa
 Mauro Tassotti
 Villiam Vecchi
 Silvano Villa
 Francesco Zanoncelli
 Vincenzo Zazzaro

List of call-ups of A.C. Milan players to the Italy national under-20 football teams

 Michelangelo Albertazzi
 Giacomo Beretta
 Matteo Bruscagin
 Matteo Darmian
 Michele Ferri
 Elia Legati
 Lino Marzoratti
 José Mauri
 Nicola Pasini

List of call-ups of A.C. Milan players to the Italy national under-19 football teams

 Michelangelo Albertazzi
 Luca Antonelli
 Matteo Ardemagni
 Roberto Bortolotto
 Matteo Bruscagin
 Matteo Darmian
 Davide Di Gennaro
 Marco Donadel
 Elia Legati
 Daniel Maldini
 Lino Marzoratti
 Alberto Paloschi
 Andrea Petagna
 Romano Perticone
 Federico Piazza
 Michele Piccolo
 Paolo Sammarco
 Mirko Stefani
 Matteo Teoldi
 Gianmarco Zigoni
 Stephan El Shaarawy

List of call-ups of A.C. Milan players to the Italy national under-18 football teams

 Ignazio Abate
 Simonluca Agazzone
 Demetrio Albertini
 Massimo Ambrosini
 Luca Antonini
 Matteo Ardemagni
 Davide Astori
 Roberto Bortolotto
 Alessio Bozzetti
 Gianpaolo Castorina
 Felice Cavaliere
 Francesco Coco
 Roberto Colombo
 Nicola Corrent
 Carlo Cudicini
 Daniele Daino
 Matteo Darmian
 Francesco De Francesco
 Michele Del Vecchio
 Davide Di Gennaro
 Michele Ferri
 Luca Gosniach
 Alessandro Iacono
 Marcello Lambrughi
 Daniel Maldini
 Claudio Mastrapasqua
 Romano Francesco Maurino
 Stefano Mondini
 Nicola Padoin
 Andrea Petagna
 Romano Perticone
 Matteo Placida
 Alessandro Quattrini
 Andrea Rabito
 Mattia Rinaldini
 Lorenzo Rossetti
 Mirco Sadotti
 Antonio Sarcinella
 Mario Stancanelli
 Mirko Stefani
 Gianmarco Zigoni

List of call-ups of A.C. Milan players to the Italy national under-17 football teams

 Michelangelo Albertazzi
 Luca Antonini
 Simone Bonomi
 Francesco Brunetti
 Riccardo Caraglia
 Nicola Corrent
 Francesco De Francesco
 Davide Di Gennaro
 Marco Donadel
 Marco Gaeta
 Mirco Gasparetto
 Mauro Gilardi
 Marcello Lambrughi
 Lino Marzoratti
 Claudio Mastrapasqua
 Fabio Moro
 Nicola Padoin
 Alberto Paloschi
 Nicola Pasini
 Filippo Perucchini
 Andrea Petagna
 Federico Piazza
 Andrea Rabito
 Lorenzo Rossetti
 Alessandro Ruggeri
 Paolo Sammarco
 Matteo Teoldi
 Francesco Tortorelli

List of call-ups of A.C. Milan players to the Italy national under-16 football teams

 Omar Fawzy
 Simonluca Agazzone
 Carmelo Augliera
 Simone Bonomi
 Antonio Borrelli
 Riccardo Caraglia
 Alessandro Cesca
 Enrico Da Ros
 Daniele Daino
 Francesco De Francesco
 Massimo De Martin
 Matteo Deinite
 Davide Di Gennaro
 Marco Donadel
 Alessandro Ercolani
 Davide Favaro
 Pasquale Foggia
 Marco Gaeta
 Marcello Lambrughi
 Giuseppe Liperoti
 Massimo Maccarone
 Battista Maina
 Enrico Malatesta
 Cristiano Manenti
 Lino Marzoratti
 James Peluchetti
 Andrea Petagna
 Federico Piazza
 Andrea Posocco
 Gabriele Sabatini
 Mirko Stefani
 Fabio Valsesia

List of call-ups of A.C. Milan players to the Italy national under-15 football teams

 Carmelo Augliera
 Simone Bonomi
 Marco Candrina
 Felice Cavaliere
 Enrico Cortese
 Daniele Daino
 Francesco De Francesco
 Matteo Deinite
 Marco Donadel
 Pasquale Foggia
 Massimiliano Greco
 Massimo Maccarone
 Cristiano Manenti
 Stefano Pastrello
 Enrico Rossoni
 Lorenzo Rossetti
 Matteo Tosin
 Fabio Valsesia

References

External links
 Italian Football Federation

A.C. Milan
Italy national football team